Rolla Eugene Dyer (November 4, 1886 – June 3, 1971) was an American physician born in Delaware County, Ohio. Dyer received his B.A. in 1907 from Kenyon College in Gambier, Ohio, and his M.D. in 1914 from the University of Texas. He joined the U.S. Public Health Service in 1916.

His first assignment involved fieldwork on bubonic plague in New Orleans. Five years later he joined the staff of the U.S. Hygienic Laboratory, became chief of the Division of Infectious Diseases in 1936, and director of National Institutes of Health from 1942 until his retirement in 1950. An expert in infectious diseases, he demonstrated how endemic typhus is spread and is noted for developing a vaccine to protect against the disease.

As director of NIH, Dr. Dyer organized the Division of Research Grants, assisted in planning the Clinical Center, and helped establish three new institutes: the National Heart Institute, the National Institute of Dental Research, and National Institute of Mental Health. He also served as a member of the scientific board of directors of the International Health Division of the Rockefeller Foundation and as director of research at Emory University until 1957.

He died in Atlanta on June 3, 1971.

His papers are held at the National Library of Medicine.

References

1886 births
1971 deaths
Directors of the National Institutes of Health
American infectious disease physicians
Kenyon College alumni
Franklin D. Roosevelt administration personnel
Truman administration personnel